Tapada da Ajuda is a green space located in Lisbon, in the parish of Alcântara.

It occupies a walled area of one hundred hectares, of free entrance. The main entrance is located on Calçada da Tapada, in the Ajuda area.

In this space, corresponding to a former royal and confining north to the Monsanto Forest Park, there are the Lisbon Astronomical Observatory, the Instituto Superior de Agronomia, an Exhibition Pavilion and the playing fields of Agronomia (rugby). At the highest point of Tapada, next to the geodesic landmark (134 m altitude), there is a belvedere that offers a vast panorama over the river Tagus.

In addition, a city from the end of the Bronze Age has been discovered in the place.

References

External links
 Study of the Higher Institute of Agronomy on the Tapada da Ajuda 
 Lisbon Astronomical Observatory 
 Instituto Superior de Agronomia 
 Birdwatching in Tapada da Ajuda 

Properties of Public Interest in Portugal